Richard Marion Gibson (December 5, 1900 – November 23, 1968) was an American football player.  A native of Jefferson County, Kentucky, he played college football at Centre College and professional football as a tackle and guard for the Louisville Brecks of the National Football League (NFL). He appeared in five NFL games during the 1922 and 1923 seasons.

References

1900 births
1968 deaths
Louisville Brecks players
People from Jefferson County, Kentucky
Players of American football from Kentucky
Centre Colonels football players